Mölle Golf Club is a golf club located on the Kullen peninsula in Höganäs Municipality, southwestern Sweden. It has hosted the Höganäs Ladies Open on the Ladies European Tour.

Location
The course, partially overlooking the Öresund strait, is situated inside the Kullaberg nature reserve, on a peninsula protruding into the Kattegat near the town of Mölle. The course sits on top of a ridge in terrain dominated by rocky outcrops and steep cliffs rising from the sea, with an elevation of up to 188 meters. Vegetation surrounding the course includes a mixed hardwood broadleaf forest consisting of birch, beech, oak and pine trees with an understory of hawthorn, juniper, wild honeysuckle and blackthorn. The site is an area of considerable biodiversity supporting a number of rare species and has been designated as an Important Bird Area as well as a Special Protection Area.

History
The course was conceived and constructed in the middle of World War II by an enthusiastic group of Swedish industrialists, on a site overlooking Occupied Denmark. The club was admitted to the Swedish Golf Federation in 1943 and the opening shot was made by Gustaf Adolf, Crown Prince of Sweden on July 6, 1945. The full 18 hole course was completed in 1959 under the supervision of Thure Bruce.

Amongst the successful players that have represented the club are Johny Andersson, winner of the 1961 European Amateur Team Championship, and Jan Rube, 1974 Swedish Golfer of the Year.

The club has hosted the Höganäs Ladies Open on the Ladies European Tour twice. In 1984 when Kitrina Douglas won ahead of Liselotte Neumann, and in 1985 when Liselotte Neumann won by one stroke over Laura Davies to secure the first Swedish European tour victory on home soil. Höganäs Ladies Open continued until 1994 as part of the Swedish Golf Tour, then feeder-tour for the LET, and saw Annika Sörenstam win as an amateur in 1990 and again in 1993.

Tournaments hosted

Gallery

See also
List of golf courses in Sweden

References

External links

Golf clubs and courses in Sweden